Roger Crowley (born 1951) is a British historian and author known for his books on maritime and Mediterranean history.

Life and career

Roger Crowley was educated at Sherborne School and read English at Emmanuel College Cambridge. As the child of a naval family, early experiences of life in Malta gave him a deep interest in the history and culture of the Mediterranean world, which has remained the major subject of his work. He has travelled widely in the Greek-speaking world, taught English in Istanbul and walked across Western Turkey. He worked for many years as a publisher before pursuing a full-time writing career. He is married and lives in England in the Gloucestershire countryside.

He has a reputation for writing compelling narrative history based on original sources and eyewitness accounts combined with careful scholarship. He is the author of a loose trilogy of books on the history of the Mediterranean:  Constantinople: The Last Great Siege/1453 (2005), drawing on his interest in Istanbul, Empires of the Sea (2008) about the contest for the Mediterranean between the Ottomans and Christian Europe, which was a Sunday Times (UK) History Book of the Year in 2009 and a New York Times Bestseller – and City of Fortune on Venice’s maritime empire (2011). These were followed by  Conquerors: How Portugal Forged the First Global Empire (2015), an account of early Portuguese activities in the Indian Ocean. His latest book, Accursed Tower: The Crusaders' Last Battle for the Holy Land (Yale, 2019) chronicles the end of the crusades and the fall of Akko in 1291.  His books have been translated into more than twenty languages.

Roger has talked to audiences as diverse as Melvyn Bragg’s BBC programme In Our Time, the Center Analyses in Washington, NATO, the Hay Festival, and the National Maritime Museum, appeared on TV programmes, written articles and reviews, and lectured to tour groups.

Bibliography
 "The First Global Empire" History Today (2015) 656#10 pp 10–17 online

Books
 1453: The Holy War for Constantinople and the Clash of Islam and the West. New York: Hachette Books, 2005.(US edition)  
 Great Constantinople: The Last Siege. London: Faber, 2005.(UK edition) 
 Empires of the Sea: The Siege of Malta, the Battle of Lepanto, and the Contest for the Center of the World. New York: Random House, 2008. (US  edition)   (UK edition) London: Faber, 2008. 
 City of Fortune: How Venice Ruled the Seas. New York: Random House, 2012. (US edition)  (UK edition) London: Faber, 2012. 
 Conquerors: How Portugal Forged the First Global Empire. New York: Random House, 2015.  (UK edition) London: Faber, 2015.  
 Accursed Tower: The Crusaders' Last Battle for the Holy Land. London: Yale University Press, 2019 (UK edition)   (US edition) Basic Books, 2019.

References

External links

Personal website

1951 births
Living people
British non-fiction writers
British maritime historians
Alumni of the University of Cambridge